Avtandil Ivanovich Makharadze (born 16 July 1943) is a Georgian actor.

He was born in Batumi. Active since the 1970s. Avtandil Makharadze started his acting career as a student at Shota Rustaveli Theatre and Film University with performances in the acts of his fellow students. His role in the play The Merchant of Venice, where he played Shylock caught the eyes of critics and the public. He worked at Shota Rustaveli Theatre until 1991 where he had played over 50 roles.

He had great success in the theater of МHАТ (Moscow Art Theatre), where in 1984, he played the main role in the play Collapse (Jaqo's Dispossessed). The same role was previously played in a television series under the same title on Georgian Television, which was one of the most controversial TV Plays of Soviet Georgia.

In 1984 Avtandil Makharadze played two main parts in the famous film by Tengiz Abuladze Repentance (those of Varlam and Abel Aravidze). In 1987 at the Cannes Film Festival Repentance won the Grand Prize of the Jury, Prize of the Ecumenical Jury and the FIPRESCI Award. The same year, at the Chicago Film Festival Avtandil Makharadze received Silver Hugo Award for the best male performance. He won the first ever Nika Award at the Moscow International Film Festival in 1987 as well.

In 1989 he starred alongside Isabelle Huppert, Bernard Blier, Erland Josephson, Richard Berry and Miki Manojlovic in Aleksandar Petrović's last film Migrations.

In 1991, Avtandil Makharadze played the main role in the film of Georgian director Mikheil Kalatozishvili The Beloved. The Film was nominated for Golden Bear at the Berlin International Film Festival.

In 1993 he received Golden Eagle at The Tbilisi International Film Festival for the best male performance in Vagif Mustafayev film Out of.

In 2004 Avtandil Makharadze starred in Vagif Mustafayev's film National Bomb which was nominated for Golden St. George at the Moscow International Film Festival. Avtandil Makharadze won the best male performance award at the Smolensk Film Festival for that part.

Makharadze played Joseph Stalin in the 2005 BBC TV series Archangel, starring opposite Daniel Craig.

Selected filmography
 Scary Mother (2017)
 All Gone  (2012)
  Archangel  (2005)
 National Bomb (2004)
 The Beloved (1991)
 Repentance (1984/1987 film)

External links

References

1943 births
Living people
People from Batumi
20th-century male actors from Georgia (country)
21st-century male actors from Georgia (country)
Male film actors from Georgia (country)
Male television actors from Georgia (country)